My Lover, My Wife is a 2011 Philippine television drama romance series broadcast by GMA Network. Directed by Jay Altajeros, it stars Nadine Samonte, Luis Alandy and Maxene Magalona. It premiered on February 28, 2011 on the network's Dramarama sa Hapon line up replacing Koreana. The series concluded on May 27, 2011 with a total of 63 episodes. It was replaced by Sisid in its timeslot.

Cast and characters

Lead cast
 Nadine Samonte as April Romero-Salvador
 Luis Alandy as Lawrence Delgado / Arthur Salvador
 Maxene Magalona as Vivian Torres-Delgado

Supporting cast
 Marco Alcaraz as Arthur Salvador
 Carmi Martin as Charity Romero
 Ernie Garcia as Roman
 Maybelyn dela Cruz as Ellen
 Jace Flores as Cesar
 Princess Snell as Hazel
 Rox Montealegre as Lyka
 Zyrael Jestre as Nicolo Delgado
 Dion Ignacio as Jordan
 Fianca Cruz as Meah
 Ernie Garcia as Ramon
 Robert Ortega as Oscar
 Prince Stefan as Dong
 Ray Ann Dulay as Gomez

Guest cast
 Richard Quan as Arnel Castro
 Mia Pangyarihan as Bianca

Ratings
According to AGB Nielsen Philippines' Mega Manila People/Individual television ratings, the pilot episode of My Lover, My Wife earned an 8.4% rating. While the final episode scored an 18.9% rating in Mega Manila household television ratings.

References

External links
 

2011 Philippine television series debuts
2011 Philippine television series endings
Filipino-language television shows
GMA Network drama series
Philippine romance television series
Television shows set in the Philippines